Dong Zhao may refer to:

Dong Zhao (Three Kingdoms), (156–236), minister that served under the Kingdom of Wei
Dong Zhao (Kuomintang), KMT general from Shaanxi